West Tuckerton is an unincorporated community located within Little Egg Harbor Township in Ocean County, New Jersey, United States. It is commonly mistaken as part of Tuckerton Borough, which it borders. West Tuckerton is usually defined as Little Egg Harbor's "town center", but the boundaries extend all the way to the Bay and contains many subdivisions that are not normally considered part of West Tuckerton and usually mistaken to be part of neighboring Mystic Island.

References

External links
 West Tuckerton Volunteer Fire Company – Station 71

Little Egg Harbor Township, New Jersey
Populated places in the Pine Barrens (New Jersey)
Unincorporated communities in Ocean County, New Jersey
Unincorporated communities in New Jersey